BMGN: Low Countries Historical Review is a peer-reviewed open-access academic journal covering the history of the Low Countries, which is taken to include the Netherlands and Belgium and their colonial and international involvements. It is published by the Royal Netherlands Historical Society (Koninklijk Nederlands Historisch Genootschap), with articles appearing either in Dutch or in English. In June 2018 it was announced that Dirk Jan Wolffram (University of Groningen) would be taking over as chair of the editorial board.

The journal was established in 1877 as the Bijdragen en Mededeelingen van het Historisch Genootschap ("Contributions and Communications of the Historical Society"). In 1969 it absorbed the Bijdragen voor de Geschiedenis der Nederlanden (established in 1946), becoming Bijdragen en Mededelingen betreffende de Geschiedenis der Nederlanden ("Contributions and Communications concerning the History of the Low Countries"), abbreviated BMGN. The journal obtained its current title in 2012, when it became an open-access online publication.

Abstracting and indexing
The journal is abstracted and indexed in:
Arts & Humanities Citation Index
Current Contents/Arts & Humanities
Current Contents/Social & Behavioral Sciences
Scopus
Social Sciences Citation Index
According to the Journal Citation Reports, the journal has a 2016 impact factor of 0.506.

References

External links

Quarterly journals
Publications established in 1877
Multilingual journals
European history journals
Academic journals published by learned and professional societies
Creative Commons Attribution-licensed journals
1877 establishments in the Netherlands